The 1994 Daytona 500, the 36th running of the event, was held February 20 at Daytona International Speedway, in Daytona Beach, Florida. Loy Allen Jr., ARCA graduate and Winston Cup rookie, driving the No. 19 for TriStar Motorsports, won the pole. Speedweeks 1994 was marked by tragedy when two drivers, Neil Bonnett and Rodney Orr, were killed in separate practice accidents for this race. Sterling Marlin in the Morgan-McClure Motorsports No. 4 won the race, the first win of his NASCAR career.

Tragedies
During Speedweeks, on the first day of practice for the Daytona 500, legendary driver Neil Bonnett crashed in turn four. Bonnett died at Halifax Hospital from massive head injuries. Three days later, reigning Goody's Dash Series (NASCAR's four-cylinder class) champion, Rodney Orr, making his Cup debut, lost control and spun in turn two. His car flipped and hit the catch fence with the roof above the driver's seat. Orr was killed instantly. After the deaths of Bonnett and Orr, NASCAR Veteran Jimmy Means announced his retirement from driving. Following these tragedies, a worried Rusty Wallace gave a lecture, calling out the drivers for over-aggression on the track, during the pre-race Drivers Meeting. In his lecture, Wallace was extremely critical of the drivers taking bold risks such as gambling on their tires, making overly-aggressive moves early in the races, and not taking much time to fix any damages to their car on pit road. In conclusion, he told the drivers, "Use your damn heads!" He was given a round of applause from the drivers and teams after his lecture.

In the middle of the Goodyear-Hoosier tire war, Hoosier released teams from their contracts three days following Orr's death. Hoosier received blame from some observers as the tires were the only linking factor between the two deaths. However, the criticism was purely speculative and NASCAR never blamed the tires for the deaths and never offered an official cause of the accident for either fatality.

An investigation done by the Orlando Sentinel blamed Orr's crash on a broken right-rear shock absorber mounting bracket. That same part was reportedly broken on Bonnett's car. NASCAR refused to comment on the outside investigation.  However, it was known teams were using extremely soft shock absorbers and springs at Daytona and Talladega in order to reduce drag.  The cars often bottomed out, creating sparks, which became visible at Daytona after the Firecracker 400 was run at night in 1998.  

The extremely soft shock absorbers and springs, along with aged pavement (last replaced in 1979) caused the mounting brackets to fail.  By 1999, drivers were complaining about the extremely soft shock package for safety issues, and NASCAR implemented rules in 2000 mandating specification shock absorbers and springs supplied by the sanctioning body at Daytona and Talladega in order to stop this dangerous practice.  As of 2022, teams in the Cup Series are required to use specification shock absorbers and springs from seventh-generation specification supplier DRiV, Inc.

Race results

References 

Daytona 500
Daytona 500
NASCAR races at Daytona International Speedway
1994 in American motorsport
Daytona 500
Daytona 500
NASCAR controversies